Women of Owu is a 2006 book written by Femi Osofisan and published through University Press PLC. Adapted from Euripides' The Trojan Women, the book uses the combination of choruses, songs and dance to depict the history of the people of Owu kingdom after a combined military force of Ife, Oyo and Ijebu invaded the city of Owu for seven years killing all of its male inhabitants and children.

Plot
Women of Owu focuses on the aftermath of a 19th-century war-torn Owu Kingdom. It reflects on the pains, depression and agony of the survivors who were only women after the killing of all males in the kingdom by the combined forces of Ife, Oyo and Ijebu. The relationship between Women of Owu and The Trojan Women has been explored by Olakunbi Olasope.

Characters
Anlugbua
Lawumi
Erelu Afin
Gesinde
Orisaye
Adumaadan
Okunade The Maye
Iyunloye

References

Nigerian non-fiction books
2006 non-fiction books
Modern adaptations of works by Euripides